Yurii Oleksiiovych Pavlenko is a Ukrainian politician and administrator, and former children's ombudsman of Ukraine.

Biography
Born in Kyiv in 1975, Pavlenko studied history at Ukrainian Humanitarian Lyceum and then at Taras Shevchenko National University of Kyiv before undertaking a Master of Public Administration degree at the Ukrainian Academy of Public Administration. He took a Ph.D. in 2010.

In 1999 Pavlenko became chairman of the Youth Party of Ukraine. He was elected a People's Deputy in the 2002 parliamentary election for the Our Ukraine Bloc. In 2005 he became a member of the People's Union "Our Ukraine" party. Pavlenko was reelected in 2006 and 2007 as an Our Ukraine Bloc candidate.

Pavlenko served as Minister for Family, Youth and Sport in the First Tymoshenko Government, the Yekhanurov Government, briefly in the Alliance of National Unity government and again in the Second Tymoshenko Government. From 2005 to 2007 Pavlenko was Ukraine's State Representative in the UNICEF Executive Board. From 26 December 2006 till 17 October 2007 Pavlenko was the (appointed) Governor of Zhytomyr Oblast. From 25 May to 24 October 2007 Pavlenko was a member of the National Security and Defense Council of Ukraine.

In August 2011 Pavlenko was appointed by Ukrainian President Viktor Yanukovych to the position of 'Authorized representative of the President of Ukraine for Children's Rights', or children's ombudsman. Pavlenko said that this was done with the consent of  the previous President, and leader of his party, Viktor Yushchenko.

On 24 February 2014 Pavlenko was dismissed as children's ombudsman by a decree of acting Ukrainian President Oleksandr Turchynov .

In the 2014 Ukrainian parliamentary election Pavlenko was again re-elected into parliament; this time after placing 24th on the electoral list of Opposition Bloc.

Pavlenko was re-elected, placed 22nd on the party list of Opposition Platform — For Life this time, in the 2019 Ukrainian parliamentary election.

Pavlenko is the first cousin of Ukrainian singer Maria Burmaka.

References

1975 births
Living people
Politicians from Kyiv
Our Ukraine (political party) politicians
Opposition Bloc politicians
Youth and sport ministers of Ukraine
Fourth convocation members of the Verkhovna Rada
Fifth convocation members of the Verkhovna Rada
Sixth convocation members of the Verkhovna Rada
Eighth convocation members of the Verkhovna Rada
Ninth convocation members of the Verkhovna Rada
Governors of Zhytomyr Oblast
Taras Shevchenko National University of Kyiv alumni
Children's Ombudsmen
Ombudsmen in Ukraine